Anqolab may refer to:
 Anqolab 1
 Anqolab 2